The Men's Pro Challenger at Tunica National is a tennis tournament held in Tunica Resorts, Mississippi since 2005. The event is part of the ''challenger series and is played on outdoor green clay courts.

Past finals

Singles

Doubles

External links 
 
ITF search

Tennis tournaments in the United States
Clay court tennis tournaments